The discography of Shabazz Palaces, an American experimental hip hop group, consists of five studio albums, three EPs, and a live album.

Albums

Studio albums

Extended plays

Live albums

Guest appearances

Remixes

References

Discographies of American artists
Hip hop discographies